Terrestre may refer to:

 Terrestre (band), a Mexican band
 Terrestre (album), 2005 album by the Italian rock band Subsonica
 terrestre or terrestris, a Latin term meaning "terrestrial"    used in systematic names for biological species

See also 
 Terrestrial (disambiguation)